Mun Song-sul (died 1997) was a North Korean politician. He served as a secretary of the Workers' Party of Korea. In 1997, he was arrested together with his relatives and later "tortured and beaten to death" on the orders of Jang Song-thaek, after he had spied on him and curtailed his influence.

Works

References

1997 deaths
Workers' Party of Korea politicians
People executed by torture